Trojan Nuclear Power Plant was a pressurized water reactor nuclear power plant (Westinghouse design) in the northwest United States, located southeast of Rainier, Oregon, and the only commercial nuclear power plant to be built in Oregon. There was much public opposition to the plant from the design stage. The three main opposition groups were the Trojan Decommissioning Alliance, Forelaws on the Board, and Mothers for Peace. There were largely non-violent protests from 1977, and subsequent arrests of participants.

The plant was connected to the grid in December 1975.

After 16 years of irregular service, the plant was closed permanently in 1992 by its operator, Portland General Electric (PGE), after cracks were discovered in the steam-generator tubing. Decommissioning and demolition of the plant began the following year and was largely completed in 2006.

While operating, Trojan represented more than 12% of the electrical generation capacity of Oregon.

History 

The Trojan Powder Company had formerly manufactured gunpowder and dynamite on a  site on the banks of the Columbia River,  from the town of Rainier, Oregon.
In 1967, Portland General Electric chose the site for a new nuclear power plant.
Construction began on February 1, 1970; first criticality was achieved on December 15, 1975, and grid connection eight days later on December 23. Commercial operation began on May 20,  under a 35-year license to expire in 2011. At the time, the single 1,130 megawatt unit at Trojan was the world's largest pressurized water reactor; it cost $460 million to build 

Environmental opposition dogged Trojan from its inception, and the opposition included non-violent protests organized by the Trojan Decommissioning Alliance. Direct action protests were held at the plant in 1977 and 1978, resulting in hundreds of arrests.

In 1978, the plant went offline on March 17 for routine refueling and was idle for nine months while modifications were made to improve its resistance to  This followed the discovery of both major building construction errors and the close proximity of a previously unknown fault. The operators sued the builders, and an undisclosed out-of-court settlement was eventually reached.

The Trojan steam generators were designed to last the life of the plant, but it was only four years before premature cracking of the steam tubes was observed. In October 1979, the plant was shut down through the end of the year  The plant had an extended shutdown in 1984, with difficulty restarting.

In the 1980 election, a ballot measure to ban construction of further nuclear power plants in the state without federally approved waste facilities was approved by the voters 608,412 (53.2%) to 535,049 (46.8%). In 1986, a ballot measure initiated by Lloyd Marbet for immediate closure of the Trojan plant failed 35.7% yes to 64.3% no. This proposal was resubmitted in 1990, and again in 1992 when a similar proposal (by Jerry and Marilyn Wilson) to close the plant was also included. Each measure was soundly defeated by vote margins over 210,000 votes.  Although all closure proposals were defeated, the plant operators committed to successively earlier closure dates for the plant.

In 1992, PGE spent $4.5 million to successfully defeat ballot measures seeking to close Trojan immediately, rather than within four years, as PGE had  At the time, it was the most expensive ballot measure campaign in Oregon history.  A week after the election, the Trojan plant suffered another steam generator tube leak of radioactive water, and was  It was announced that replacement of the steam generators would be necessary. In December 1992, documents were leaked from the U.S. Nuclear Regulatory Commission showing that staff scientists believed that Trojan might be unsafe  In early January 1993, PGE chief executive Ken Harrison announced the company would not try to

After 1993 decision not to restart
The spent fuel was transferred from cooling pools to 34 concrete and steel storage casks in 2003.

It was awaiting transport to the Yucca Mountain Repository until that project was canceled in 2009.

The iconic  cooling tower, visible from Interstate 5 in Washington and U.S. Route 30 in Oregon, was demolished in 2006 via dynamite implosion at 7:00 a.m. PDT on Sunday,  This event marked the first implosion of a cooling tower at a nuclear plant in the United States. Additional demolition work on the remaining structures continued through 2008. The central office building and the reactor building were demolished by Northwest Demolition and Dismantling in 2008. Remaining are five buildings: two warehouses, a small building on the river side, a guard shack, and offices outside the secured facility.  It is expected that demolition of the plant will cost approximately $230 million, which includes the termination of the plant possession-only license, conventional demolition of the building and continuing cost for storage of used nuclear fuel.

A number of the civil defence sirens that were originally installed within a  radius of Trojan, to warn of an incident at the plant that could endanger the general public, continue to stand in the Washington cities of Longview, Kelso, and Kalama. Some of the other sirens, which have been removed, have been repurposed as tsunami warning sirens along the Oregon coast. While there are no plans to remove the remaining sirens, the city of Longview has removed a few of the sirens on an as-needed basis to make way for other projects.

Heliport
Trojan Heliport  was a 60 x 60 ft. (18 x 18 m) private turf heliport located at the power plant. It is no longer listed in the FAA website.

References

External links 

 Portland General Electric information about the plant (archived version of page from August 2008 available from archive.org)
 Local television news coverage of the implosion from many different angles
 High Country News article providing some of the time line of the plant

Energy infrastructure completed in 1976
Buildings and structures in Columbia County, Oregon
Nuclear power plants in Oregon
Former nuclear power stations in the United States
Nuclear power stations using pressurized water reactors
Portland General Electric
Demolished buildings and structures in Oregon
1976 establishments in Oregon
Buildings and structures demolished in 2006
Buildings and structures demolished by controlled implosion
Heliports in the United States
1992 disestablishments in Oregon
Former power stations in Oregon